Snake Catcher is a 1985 Soviet drama film directed by Vadim Derbenyov.

Plot 
The film tells about the former director of a large Moscow deli who ended up in a strict regime colony, and after leaving this began to fight criminals.

Cast 
 Aleksandr Mikhaylov as Pavel Sergeevich Shorokhov
 Natalya Belokhvostikova as Lena
 Leonid Markov as Pyotr Vasilievich Kotov
 Donatas Banionis as Boris
 Lyubov Polishchuk as Vera
 Svetlana Kryuchkova	 as Zina	
 Leonid Kuravlyov  as Konstantin
 Galina Polskikh as Nina
 Valentina Titova	as Tamara
 Viktor Shulgin as Anatoly Semyonovich
 Alexander Pyatkov as Stasik
 Igor Starygin as Boris's  the guarantor

Awards 
 Soviet Screen Award for Best Actor Year  (Aleksandr Mikhaylov)

Critical response 
Film critic Alexander Fedorov  notes in his review:
In phantasmagoric black-and-white dreams, ingeniously filmed by cinematographer Mikhail Agranovich, one can catch echoes of the director's former poetic metaphors, but otherwise Vadim Derbenev tries to keep within the framework of the traditional genre of crime drama. Tries... But comes out superficial and boring.

See also
 OBKhSS

References

External links 
 

1985 films
1980s Russian-language films
Soviet drama films
1985 drama films
Mosfilm films
Films based on Russian novels